Tennis Scotland is the official governing body of tennis in Scotland. It was founded as the Scottish Lawn Tennis Association (SLTA) in 1895. In 1977 the Scottish Lawn Tennis Association dropped the word 'Lawn' and became the Scottish Tennis Association (STA).

History
The Scottish Lawn Tennis Association (SLTA) was founded in 1895, eight years after the Welsh Lawn Tennis Association (f,1887), and seven years after the Lawn Tennis Association (f.1888). In 1977 Scottish Lawn Tennis Association dropped the word 'Lawn' and became the Scottish Tennis Association (STA). The Scottish Tennis Association is currently branded as Tennis Scotland.

Governance & Structure
Tennis Scotland is governed by a board of directors who review, monitor and support the strategic direction of the Organisation via the Chief Executive.

The Board and Chief Executive are responsible for strategy and delivery for Tennis Scotland. Tennis Scotland has an Executive Team which is charged with the day-to-day operation of the business led by Chief Executive Blane Dodds who is also a Trustee on the board of directors.

Board Of Directors & Honorary President
Current as of 2023:
 Chair Graham Watson
 Chief Executive Blane Dodds
 President John Stirling
 Vice President John Wilson
 Non-Executive Director Derek Quirk
 Non Executive Director Deborah Hood
 Non-Executive Director Anja Vreg
 Non-Executive Director Michele Mair
 Non-Executive Director Graeme Gault
 Non-Executive Director Sean Lineen
 Company Secretary Barbara Southern
 Honorary President Dennis D Carmichael OBE

Organization
Included:

Regions and Districts

West of Scotland
Website: www.tenniswos.co.uk
Executive Director: John Stevenson
President: Barry Gibson-Smith
Welfare Officer: Baljinder Purba

East of Scotland
 Website: www.clubspark.lta.org.uk/EastofScotlandDistrict/
 President: Viki Mendelssohn
 Secretary: TBC
 Welfare Officer: TBC

South of Scotland
Includes Districts: Tennis Ayrshire, Tennis Borders and Tennis Dumfries & Galloway

Tennis Ayrshire
 Website: www.tennisayrshire.org.uk
 President: John Wilson, president@tennisayrshire.org.uk
 Secretary: Stephen-Mark Williams
 Welfare Officer: TBC

Tennis Borders
 Website: www.sites.google.com/site/borderstennis
 President: Eddie Brogan
 Secretary: Angie Laidlaw
 Welfare Officer: TBC

Tennis Dumfries & Galloway
 Website: www.dumfriesandgallowaytennis.com
 President: Keith Thom
 Secretary: Lister McKidddie
 Welfare Office: TBC

North of Scotland
Includes Districts: Tennis Central, Tennis Tayside, North East Scotland LTA and Highlands Tennis Ltd.

Tennis Central
Website: www.tenniscentralscotland.org
 President: Alan Christie
 Secretary: David Knapman
 Welfare Officer: Hannah Pickford

Tennis Tayside
Website: www.tennistayside.org
 President: Ann Hill
 Secretary: Joy Mayglothling
 Welfare Office: TBC

North East Scotland LTA
 Website: www.clubspark.lta.org.uk/NorthEastScotlandLawnTennisassociation
 President: Dave Macdermid
 Secretary: Sheila Williams
 Welfare Office: TBC

Highlands Tennis Ltd
 Website: www.clubspark.lta.org.uk/highlandtennis
 President: Teresa Tait
 Secretary: Hamish McBain
 Welfare Officer: Lesley McCracken

Current tournaments
The Tennis Scotland (TS Open Tour 2022) leaderboard was introduced in 2018, allowing players to accumulate ranking points and climb the tables whilst competing at events on the circuit throughout the year. In addition to the frontrunners being crowned leaderboard champions, individuals occupying the top 12 spots on the men’s and women’s rankings also earn the chance to compete at the TS Open Tour Masters event in December.
 Ayrshire Open
 British Tour Glasgow
 British Your Giffnock Open
 East Lothian Open
 Moir Construction Tayside Open
 North East Championships Indoors
 Scottish Clay Court Championships
 Scottish Indoor Championships
 Scottish National Championships
 St Andrew's University Open
 Stirling University Open
 South of Scotland Championships
 Tennis Championships of the Highlands
 The North East of Scotland Championships
 VMH Solicitors East of Scotland
 Waverley ROGY Open
 West Highland Championships
 West of Scotland Open Championships
 Whitecraigs Easter Tournament

See also
Tennis in Scotland
Tennis Wales
Lawn Tennis Association

References

External links
Tennis Scotland Site

1895 establishments in the United Kingdom
Sports governing bodies in the United Kingdom
Tennis in the United Kingdom
Tennis in Scotland